Aero Fighters, known as  in Japan, is a vertically scrolling shooter originally released in arcades in 1992 by Video System and was ported to the Super Nintendo Entertainment System in 1993. It was the first in the Aero Fighters series, and a spiritual successor to the 1991 Turbo Force.

Gameplay 

This game uses basic shooter mechanics of the SHMUP genre of video games. Pressing button 1 fires normal weapons; this can be upgraded by collecting P or the rare F items, though the maximum power level has a hidden ammo count, after which the player will return to the previous power level. Pressing button 2 launches a powerful special attack; uses are limited to how many B items the player has collected (every life starts with two). Some ground enemies will drop score items when destroyed; they appear as the currency of the selected character's nation. By default, players start with three lives, and can acquire one more at 200,000 points.

Aero Fighters is famous for its large cast of characters, unheard of in 1992. Each pair of characters represents one of four nations. The two-player sides may only select the four characters given (one for each nation). In a two-player game, only a single nation can be chosen.

The game has seven stages divided into two parts. The first three stages are selected randomly from a group of four, with one for each character's nation; however, a character will never go to its nation's stage. The other four stages are fixed. After beating all seven stages, the player sees the character's ending, then play much more difficult versions of those stages, after which the game truly ends.

Reception

In Japan, Game Machine listed Aero Fighters on their May 1, 1992 issue as being the second most-successful table arcade unit of the month. RePlay also reported the game to be the second most-popular arcade game at the time. Despite being a solid entry, the arcade version had little to distinguish itself from the competition. One critic wrote: "Aero Fighters is a thoroughly solid game, let's get that out of the way. It is also a game that is easy to forget. At a time when shooters were a dime a dozen it didn't exactly stand out."

GamePro gave the Super NES version a negative review, saying the weapons are imaginative but the game suffers from slowdown, mediocre graphics, weak sound effects, and "monotonous" music, concluding that "Aero Fighters''' action won't stay with you - it's a temporary thrill that eventually retreats to the hanger." But this port has been considered among the best SHMUPs of that platform, likely due to a lack of competition.

Legacy
An emulated version of the game was released in 2005 for the PlayStation 2 as part of the Japan-exclusive Oretachi Gēsen Zoku series. In 2022, the original arcade version will be included as part of the Sega Astro City Mini V, a vertically-oriented variant of the Sega Astro City mini console. Copies of the game are rare, with astronomical prices on auction sites.

Sequels

Shin Nakamura, the main designer of Aero Fighters and a number of other Video System games, disliked the company's plan to start developing on the Neo Geo. He wanted to make more vertical games like Aero Fighters, but found it difficult to do so on a horizontal monitor. He and other like-minded employees left to found Psikyo, with the similar Samurai Aces being their first game.

McO'River would never publish another title under that name. Back at Video System, meanwhile, other employees teamed up with the remaining Aero Fighters staff to begin work on sequels. Aero Fighters 2 and Aero Fighters 3 were released for the Neo Geo. Sonic Wings Special, a sort of "dream match" game based on the three previous entries, was released for the Sega Saturn and later for the PlayStation. Soon after, Special was reworked for the arcades into Sonic Wings Limited.  In 1997, McO'River, Inc. changed its name to Video System U.S.A., Inc. A year later, Paradigm Entertainment developed Aero Fighters Assault for Video System. Sonic Wings Special and Limited were both made for a vertical monitor like the first game. Similarly, Nakamura would make Strikers 1945 Plus for the Neo Geo a few years later.

In popular culture
YouTuber and author John Green, having come across the game in the Savannah Airport, mistakenly read the title as "Nerd Fighters" while filming a video addressing his brother Hank Green on the popular YouTube channel Vlogbrothers on February 17, 2007. "Nerdfighters" and "Nerdfighteria" eventually became the collective title of the Vlogbrothers' fan community. In September 2013, he was given an Aero Fighters arcade cabinet as a gift.

References

External links
 
 
 Aero Fighters at Arcade-History''

1992 video games
Arcade video games
Hamster Corporation franchises
Head-to-head arcade video games
Vertically scrolling shooters
Super Nintendo Entertainment System games
Video games developed in Japan
Video games scored by Naoki Itamura
Video System games
Vertically-oriented video games
Multiplayer and single-player video games
Tecmo games